The St. Stanislaus and St. Wenceslaus Cathedral, also called Świdnica Cathedral, is a historical monument and a main Catholic building in Świdnica, Poland.

Construction of the current church began in 1330 at the behest of Duke Bolko II of Świdnica, following a fire that destroyed a wooden building that stood there. The new building, in Gothic style, was designed as a three-aisled basilica with a slender Gothic tower that measures 102 meters, the largest in the region. Between 1400 and 1410 the building was expanded. In years 1535-1546 the church was renovated after it was greatly damaged in the fire of 1532.

From 1561 to 1629 the church was owned by Protestants. From 1662 it belonged to the Jesuits who in the years 1671-1688 have added to it baroque furniture and decorations that still characterize its interior. With the gradual expulsion of the Jesuits of Prussian Silesia, the church was secularized in 1772 and the Prussian authorities converted it into a barn.

The church was renovated between 1893 and 1895 but lost many of its original architectural features. On March 25, 2004, with the bull Multos fructus, of Pope John Paul II, established the Catholic Diocese of Świdnica, and the building became the cathedral.

See also
Roman Catholicism in Poland
St. Stanislaus

References

Roman Catholic cathedrals in Poland
Buildings and structures in Świdnica
Roman Catholic churches completed in 1546
Świdnica
16th-century Roman Catholic church buildings in Poland